Richard Nagler (born 1947) is an American businessman and photographer. Four monographs of his photography have been published. His photography has been exhibited in numerous museum and gallery exhibitions throughout the United States and Europe; and included in public and private collections. The work has also been featured in publications including: The New York Times, The Wall Street Journal, Artforum International, Artweek, The Los Angeles Times, Playboy Magazine and the San Francisco Chronicle. Nagler graduated from the University of Pennsylvania in 1969 magna cum laude/Phi Beta Kappa with a B. A. in politics and philosophy, and began his career in photography in the 1970s. Richard Nagler is also a book reviewer specializing in photography and other fine arts for The New York Journal of Books.

Book reviews

My Love Affair with Miami Beach
The book features photographs that focus on a small Jewish neighborhood; South Beach in Miami Beach, Florida.

Nobel laureate Isaac Bashevis Singer who wrote the introduction and provides commentary throughout the book said: "People in this country have a prejudice about Miami Beach; it means to them vulgar Jews...I say, 'vulgar – shmulgar'...they're only people...when people are on vacation or they retire, they can act a little, as they say, 'out of this world'...I see many funny and silly things here often because many people desire to appear young and not old." The Washington Post gave it a positive review, saying: "It's a marvelous portrait of a neighborhood, with Singer's impassioned commentary – by no means limited to the topic at hand – a fine bonus".

The New York Times called the book "evocative" and said Nagler's photographs reflect a "sense of irony and humor" that's similar to Singer's commentary in the book. They also wrote, "this buoyant blend of words and images captures both the idiosyncratic spirit and the deep sadness of these South Beach survivors."

Oakland Rhapsody: The Secret Soul of an American Downtown 
The San Francisco Chronicle''''wrote (June 4, 1995) Novelist Ishmael Reed calls Oakland the city that refuses to die, and these richly evocative photographs demonstrate why.
"The Oakland Tribune" noted (May 25, 1995) that: On the cover, the vibrant glow of dusk wraps Oakland's downtown in majesty, innocence, and romance. But the image that emerges from the pages of the handsome coffee table art book is not idyllic, but real.

Word on the Street

This monograph features photographs taken in various cities in California, and also in New York, Las Vegas, Tel Aviv, London and Paris. Every picture shows the juxtapositions of a single wordand a single person who happens to pass by and is photographed by Nagler.

Allen Ginsberg said of the book, "the photographs of Nagler brought to mind the concentrated, evocative form of haiku", calling the images "picture poems." UK based Digital Photographer was impressed with the work calling the pictures, "compelling, shocking, amusing, and sensitive, each portrait is a visual pun-a wink to the reader and an invitation to create a story to complete the narrative...the magic of his work rests in the serendipitous moment when person and word come together....and reveals that we are all part of an amazing artistic mosaic, even as we blithely stroll down the street".Sacramento News & Review gave it a positive review stating, "Nagler's rare photos show signs of Henri Cartier-Bresson’s artist sensitivity and Dorothea Lange’s grit and realism...but he is not above making jokes; watch for his wit and ironic wisdom in this insightful collection. Lawrence Ferlinghetti wrote, "Richard Nagler finds ‘Words’ in the streets like objets trouvés, giving each an inscrutable meaning." Ishmael Reed opined that "Nagler is watching the world carefully and seeing what we say about the world and the world says about us, one word at a time."

Looking at Art, the Art of Looking
Nagler got the idea for this book in 2007 when he was at the Museum of Modern Art in New York. The book features photographs of works of art in museums and the patrons who are standing in front on them viewing the artwork.SF Gate commented on the "startling mirroring elements" of the photographs: "A woman with a patchwork jacket and skullcap blends into Gottfried Helnwein's Epiphany II (Adoration of the Shepherds), and a woman with a geometric-patterned scarf looks like an extension of Ellsworth Kelly's [1951 oil on wood painting], Cité. Shutterbug Magazine said the images between the viewers and the artwork were "magical moments" and that the "viewer's reaction to the piece is what gives the art its heart and soul, bringing it to life...Nagler masters that task expertly as he links the viewer and the piece together as equals, parts of a greater entity". The San Francisco Examiner noted one minor disappointment in the book: the year the photograph was taken is missing.

Exhibitions

Bibliography

See also
100 Photographs that Changed the World
Marion Post Wolcott

Notes

References

Sources

External links
 Official website
Richard Nagler, Berkeley photographer video at SF Gate''
Richard Nagler at Krevsky Gallery

Living people
American male writers
1947 births
Monographs
Photographers from California